Richard Hadley (born 29 March 1983) is a former Australian rules footballer who played for the Brisbane Lions and Carlton in the Australian Football League (AFL).

Hadley was recruited from the East Fremantle Football Club junior system in the Western Australian Football League (WAFL) to the Brisbane Lions in the 2000 AFL Draft. He made his AFL debut in 2001. While suffering from osteitis pubis, he spent the 2001, 2002 and 2003 seasons as a prolific ball-winner player in the Lions' reserves team. After a long wait, he was finally recalled to the Lions lineup in the 2003 finals series, and in his fourth senior game of AFL football, he was part of Brisbane's premiership side.

In 2004, Hadley's fourth season on the Lions' list, he took the Rookie of the Year award (he was still eligible because he had only played four games previously and was 20 years of age at the start of the year, just below the under 21 threshold). During the 2005 season, he injured his anterior cruciate ligament (ACL) and missed the entire season.

While his schedule to a return was on track, he again injured his ACL during a NAB Challenge game against Collingwood at Carrara on 18 March 2006. He then missed the entire 2006 season.

Hadley was traded to Carlton at the end of the 2007 season for Carlton's fourth-round selection in the 2007 AFL Draft (number 52 overall). He continued to be troubled by injuries, playing six games in 2008, eleven in 2009 and eight in 2010. He also played several games for Carlton's , the Northern Bullants.

Hadley announced his retirement from AFL football after the 2010 season, at the age of 27. After spending ten seasons on an AFL playing list, injuries had restricted him to 66 AFL games. He returned to East Fremantle, where he had played as a junior, and played 49 WAFL matches for the club between 2011 and 2013, including serving as vice-captain, before retiring at the end of the 2013 season.
Currently runs Healthfreak Cafe Applecross, WA.

Statistics

|- style="background-color: #EAEAEA"
! scope="row" style="text-align:center" | 2001
|style="text-align:center;"|
| 14 || 1 || 0 || 1 || 3 || 1 || 4 || 1 || 3 || 0.0 || 1.0 || 3.0 || 1.0 || 4.0 || 1.0 || 3.0
|-
! scope="row" style="text-align:center" | 2002
|style="text-align:center;"|
| 14 || 0 || — || — || — || — || — || — || — || — || — || — || — || — || — || —
|-style="background:#eaeaea;"
! scope="row" style="text-align:center;" | 2003
|style="text-align:center;"|
| 14 || 3 || 1 || 1 || 14 || 10 || 24 || 6 || 6 || 0.3 || 0.3 || 4.7 || 3.3 || 8.0 || 2.0 || 2.0
|-
! scope="row" style="text-align:center" | 2004
|style="text-align:center;"|
| 14 || 23 || 6 || 6 || 148 || 162 || 310 || 77 || 68 || 0.3 || 0.3 || 6.4 || 7.0 || 13.5 || 3.3 || 3.0
|-style="background:#eaeaea;"
! scope="row" style="text-align:center" | 2005
|style="text-align:center;"|
| 14 || 0 || — || — || — || — || — || — || — || — || — || — || — || — || — || —
|-
! scope="row" style="text-align:center" | 2006
|style="text-align:center;"|
| 14 || 0 || — || — || — || — || — || — || — || — || — || — || — || — || — || —
|-style="background:#eaeaea;"
! scope="row" style="text-align:center" | 2007
|style="text-align:center;"|
| 14 || 14 || 3 || 3 || 116 || 118 || 234 || 54 || 36 || 0.2 || 0.2 || 8.3 || 8.4 || 16.7 || 3.9 || 2.6
|-
! scope="row" style="text-align:center" | 2008
|style="text-align:center;"|
| 10 || 6 || 2 || 3 || 41 || 49 || 90 || 26 || 27 || 0.3 || 0.5 || 6.8 || 8.2 || 15.0 || 4.3 || 4.5
|-style="background:#eaeaea;"
! scope="row" style="text-align:center" | 2009
|style="text-align:center;"|
| 10 || 11 || 3 || 2 || 79 || 128 || 207 || 45 || 45 || 0.3 || 0.2 || 7.2 || 11.6 || 18.8 || 4.1 || 4.1
|-
! scope="row" style="text-align:center" | 2010
|style="text-align:center;"|
| 10 || 8 || 1 || 1 || 50 || 88 || 138 || 23 || 36 || 0.1 || 0.1 || 6.3 || 11.0 || 17.3 || 2.9 || 4.5
|- class="sortbottom"
! colspan=3| Career
! 66
! 16
! 17
! 451
! 556
! 1007
! 232
! 221
! 0.2
! 0.3
! 6.8
! 8.4
! 15.3
! 3.5
! 3.3
|}

References

External links

Richard Hadley's Bluseum profile

1983 births
Living people
Brisbane Lions players
Brisbane Lions Premiership players
Carlton Football Club players
East Fremantle Football Club players
Preston Football Club (VFA) players
Australian rules footballers from Western Australia
People from Gnowangerup, Western Australia
One-time VFL/AFL Premiership players